Run Girls, Run! is a Japanese voice-actor group consisting of Coco Hayashi, Yūka Morishima, and Nanami Atsugi associated with Avex Pictures and 81 Produce. The group as artists released songs collaborating with anime works such as Wake Up, Girls! New Chapter, Kiratto Pri Chan, and others. They appear as voice actor in those programs.

History 
Coco, Yūka and Nanami have passed the audition jointly held by Avex and 81 Produce in 2017 (avex x 81 Produce Wake Up, Girls! 3rd Anime Song Vocal Audition) and formed Run Girls, Run! at July 30, 2017.

Run Girls, Run! appeared in Wake Up, Girls! New Chapter as a group with the same unit name, and their first song KAKERU x KAKERU was used in it,.

On February 28, 2018, they released the debut single Slide Ride as the opening theme of Death March to the Parallel World Rhapsody.

In the anime Kiratto Pri Chan airing from April 2018 to March 2021, they voiced Mirai Momoyama, Rinka Aoba, and Mel Shido. They also sang all of the opening themes of Kiratto Pri Chan.

On July 25, 2022, it was announced on their official website that the group would disband on March 31, 2023.

Members 
 Coco Hayashi, nicknamed Hayamaru (はやまる)
 Yūka Morishima, nicknamed Mocchi (もっちー), the leader
 Nanami Atsugi, nicknamed Acchan (あっちゃん)

Timeline

Discography

Albums

Singles

References

External links
  
 
 Run Girls, Run! on Spotify

Japanese girl groups
Japanese musical trios
Anime singers
Vocal trios